The 2009–2010 season was Sarajevo's 61st season in existence, and their 16th consecutive season in the top flight of Bosnian football, the Premier League of BiH. Besides competing in the Premier League, the team competed in the National Cup and the qualifications for UEFA Europa League. During the season club changed the managers. Mirza Varešanović become the Sarajevo's manager on 7 April 2010, after Mehmed Janjoš left the position on 28 March. During the transition period, Almir Turković, assistant coach of Mehmed Janjoš, was positioned as the head coach. The season covers the period from 25 June 2009 to 24 June 2010.

In this season, Sarajevo reached the play-off round of Europa League, which is one of the best results in European competitions in "after-war era" of club's history. Team finished in 5th place of Premier League, and they ended their Cup journey in Second round.

Players

Squad

(Captain)

Source:

Statistics

Source:

Competitions

Premier League

League table

Matches

UEFA Europa League

Sarajevo entered the Europa League at the second qualifying round.

Second qualifying round
On 22 June, Sarajevo were drawn to face Spartak Trnava (Slovakia) or Inter Baku (Azerbaijan) in the Second qualifying round of the UEFA Europa League. On 9 July, it was determined that Spartak would be Sarajevo's opponent, having defeated Inter 5–2 on aggregate. By winning 2–1 on aggregate, Sarajevo secured place in the Third qualifying round. Before the second leg match, supporters of both teams had a fight on the streets of Trnava, which resulted in few injured fans.

Third qualifying round

Sarajevo 3–3 Helsingborg on aggregate. Sarajevo won 5–4 on penalties.

Play-off round

CFR Cluj won 3–2 on aggregate.

Kit

References

FK Sarajevo seasons
Sarajevo